Sir Dallas Gerald Mercer Bernard, 1st Baronet (22 March 188826 November 1975) was a banker in England, Hong Kong, and the Middle East.

Early life
Bernard was born on 22 March 1888. Bernards's parents were Edmund Bowen Bernard and Arabella Margaret Piercy. Bernard studied at Stubbington House School in Fareham, Hampshire, England.

After Bernard held the rank of midshipman in the Royal Navy, he attended Thames Nautical Training College in Foots Cray Place, Kent.

Career
Bernard arrived in the Far East and joined Jardine, Matheson & Co. by at least 1912, at which point he was working there as an assistant. He was chairman of the trustees of the Sailors' Home and on the Local General Committee of the Missions to Seamen in Hong Kong in the 1920s. He was the managing director of Jardine Matheson from 1928 to 1942. Bernard was also director of other companies such as the Chinese Central Railways between 1928 and 1942 and the Alliance Assurance Company between 1931 and 1942. Bernard was also the chairman of the Hongkong and Shanghai Banking Corporation. During his time in Hong Kong he was appointed Unofficial Member of the Executive Council in 1926 and 1927 and Legislative Council in 1926. He was on the Legislative Council's Standing Law Committee.

Bernard became the director of the Bank of England from 1936 to 1949 and the High Sheriff of the County of London from 1942 to 1943 and later on the Lieutenant of the City of London. After the war, he continued to serve the bank and rose to the deputy governor of the Bank of England in 1949 until 1954 when he left the bank.

After leaving the Bank of England, Bernard joined the Courtaulds and became the director between 1954 and 1956 and between 1964 and 1965 and also the deputy-chairman from 1956 to 1962. He was also active in banking in the Middle East. In 1954, he was appointed chairman of the Jordan Currency Board, which became the sole authority entitled to issue Jordanian dinar. He held the post until 1957 and continued as the chairman of the British Bank of the Middle East from 1954 until 1965.

He was created 1st Baronet Bernard, of Snakemoor, in the County of Southampton on 27 January 1954.

Personal life
Bernard married Elizabeth "Betty" Addis, daughter of Sir Charles Stewart Addis and Elizabeth Jane McIsaac on 16 November 1922. Bernard died on 26 November 1975 at age 87. Bernard and his wife have three children: Elizabeth Piercy Bernard (10 April 192429 November 1981), Sir Dallas Bernard, 2nd Bt. (born 14 December 1926), and Margaret Anne Bernard (6 June 19297 October 2010).

References

1888 births
1975 deaths
Hong Kong bankers
British bankers
British people in British Hong Kong
British expatriates in China
Members of the Executive Council of Hong Kong
Members of the Legislative Council of Hong Kong
Jardine Matheson Group
Chairmen of HSBC
People associated with the Bank of England
Deputy Governors of the Bank of England
High Sheriffs of the County of London
Royal Navy officers
Baronets in the Baronetage of the United Kingdom
20th-century English businesspeople